Lale is a village in Momchilgrad Municipality, Kardzhali Province, southern Bulgaria.

Honours
Lale Buttress in Graham Land, Antarctica is named after the village.

References

Villages in Kardzhali Province